Bezirk Lilienfeld is a district of the state of Lower Austria in Austria.

Municipalities 
 Annaberg
 Annarotte, Haupttürnitzrotte, Langseitenrotte, Lassingrotte
 Eschenau
 Eschenau, Laimergraben, Rotheau, Sonnleitgraben, Steubach, Wehrabach
 Hainfeld
 Bernau, Gegend Egg, Gerichtsberg, Gerstbach, Gölsen, Gstettl, Hainfeld, Heugraben, Kasberg, Kaufmannberg, Landstal, Ob der Kirche, Vollberg
 Hohenberg
 Andersbach, Furthof, Hofamt, Hohenberg, Innerfahrafeld
 Kaumberg
 Höfnergraben, Kaumberg, Laabach, Obertriesting, Steinbachtal, Untertriesting
 Kleinzell
 Außerhalbach, Ebenwald, Innerhalbach, Kleinzell
 Lilienfeld
 Dörfl, Hintereben, Jungherrntal, Lilienfeld, Marktl, Schrambach, Stangental, Vordereben, Zögersbach
 Mitterbach am Erlaufsee
 Josefsrotte, Mitterbach-Seerotte
 Ramsau
 Fahrabach, Gaupmannsgraben, Haraseck, Kieneck, Oberhöhe, Oberried, Ramsau, Schneidbach, Unterried
 Rohrbach an der Gölsen
 Bernreit, Durlaß, Oberrohrbach, Prünst, Unterrohrbach
 Sankt Aegyd am Neuwalde
 Kernhof, Lahnsattel, Mitterbach, St. Aegyd am Neuwalde, Ulreichsberg
 Sankt Veit an der Gölsen
 Außer-Wiesenbach, Inner-Wiesenbach, Kerschenbach, Kropfsdorf, Maierhöfen, Obergegend, Pfenningbach, Rainfeld, Schwarzenbach an der Gölsen, St. Veit an der Gölsen, Steinwandleiten, Traisenort, Wiesenfeld, Wobach
 Traisen
 Türnitz
 Anthofrotte, Außerfahrafeld, Lehenrotte, Moosbach, Pichlrotte, Raxenbachrotte, Schildbachrotte, Steinbachrotte, Traisenbachrotte, Türnitz, Weidenaurotte

 
Districts of Lower Austria